Mecodina is a genus of moths of the family Erebidae first described by Achille Guenée in 1852.

Description
Palpi sickle shaped, where the second joint reaching vertex of head. Third joint long and naked. Thorax and abdomen smoothly scaled. Mid and hind tibia slightly fringed with hair on outer side. Forewing with rectangular apex. Areole usually narrow. Hindwings with vein 5 from close to lower angle of cell.

Species
Mecodina aequilinea Hampson, 1926 Assam
Mecodina africana (Holland, 1894) Gabon
Mecodina agrestis (Swinhoe, 1890) Myanmar
Mecodina albodentata (Swinhoe, 1895) India (Meghalaya)
Mecodina ambigua Leech, 1900 western China
Mecodina analis (Swinhoe, 1890) Myanmar
Mecodina apicia Hampson, 1926 Ghana
Mecodina bisignata (Walker, 1865) Timor, Sulawesi, New Guinea, Australia
Mecodina cataloxia Viette, 1958 Madagascar
Mecodina ceruleosparsa Hampson, 1907 Khasis
Mecodina cineracea (Butler, 1879) Japan
Mecodina costanotata Wileman & West, 1929 Philippines (Luzon)
Mecodina costimacula Leech, 1900 western China
Mecodina cyanodonta Hampson, 1902 Khasis
Mecodina diastriga Hampson, 1926 Java
Mecodina duplicata Leech, 1900 central China
Mecodina externa Leech, 1900 central China
Mecodina fasciata Sugi, 1982 Japan
Mecodina hybrida Prout, 1926 Borneo
Mecodina imperatrix (Holland, 1894) Gabon
Mecodina inconspicua (Wileman & South, 1916) Taiwan
Mecodina karapinensis Strand, 1920 Japan
Mecodina kurosawai Sugi, 1982 Japan
Mecodina lanceola Guenée, 1852 Bangladesh
Mecodina lankesteri Leech, 1900 Sichuan
Mecodina leucosticta Hampson, 1926 Singapore
Mecodina metagrapta Hampson, 1926 Bali
Mecodina mollita (Warren, 1913) Ichang
Mecodina nigripuncta Hampson, 1926 Ghana
Mecodina nubiferalis (Leech, 1889) Japan
Mecodina ochrigraphta Hampson, 1926 southern Nigeria
Mecodina odontophora (Swinhoe, 1895) Meghalaya
Mecodina placida (Moore, 1882) western Bengal
Mecodina praecipua (Walker, 1865) Sri Lanka
Mecodina ruficeps Hampson, 1895 Nagas
Mecodina rufipalpis Hampson, 1926 Angola
Mecodina sichotensis (Kurentzov, 1950) south-eastern Siberia
Mecodina subcostalis (Walker, 1865) northern China
Mecodina subviolacea (Butler, 1881) Japan
Mecodina umbrosa (Hampson, 1893) Sri Lanka
Mecodina variata Robinson, 1969 Fiji

References

Calpinae
Moth genera